Harry Pearson (born 1961) is an English journalist and author, specialising in sport.

He has twice won The Cricket Society/MCC Book of the Year award: in 2011 for Slipless in Settle and in 2018 for Connie: The Marvellous Life of Learie Constantine. Reviewing Slipless in Settle in Wisden, Gideon Haigh referred to Pearson as "an extremely funny writer who turns a phrase like a doosra".

He has been a regular contributor to the monthly football magazine When Saturday Comes for 20 years and has also written a weekly column for The Guardian.

Books
 The Far Corner: A Mazy Dribble through North-East Football (1994)
 North Country Fair: Travels among Racing Pigs and Giant Marrows (1996)
 A Tall Man in a Low Land: Some Time among the Belgians (1998)
 Around the World by Mouse (2005)
 Achtung Schweinehund!: A Boy's Own Story of Imaginary Combat (2007)
 Dribble!: The Unbelievable Football Encyclopaedia (2007)
 Hound Dog Days: One Dog and His Man: A Story of North Country Life and Canine Contentment (2008)
 Slipless in Settle: A Slow Turn around Northern Cricket (2010)
 Conkers for Goalposts (2010; compiler)
 Housekeepers, Shortlegs and Flemish String: Three Village Sports Clubs in Northumberland (2012) 
 The Trundlers: The Military Medium-Paced Story of Cricket's Most Invaluable Breed (2013)
 Connie: The Life of Learie Constantine (2017)
 The Beast, the Emperor and the Milkman: A Bone-shaking Tour through Cycling's Flemish Heartlands (2019)
 The Farther Corner: A Sentimental Return to North-East Football (2020)

References

1961 births
Living people
Cricket historians and writers
Cycling writers
English journalists
English sportswriters